Eleanor Torrey Powell (November 21, 1912 – February 11, 1982) was an American dancer and actress. Best remembered for her tap dance numbers in musical films in the 1930s and 1940s, she was one of Metro-Goldwyn-Mayer's top dancing stars during the Golden Age of Hollywood. Powell appeared in vaudeville, on Broadway, and most prominently, in a series of movie musical vehicles tailored especially to showcase her dance talents, including Born to Dance (1936), Broadway Melody of 1938 (1937), Rosalie (1937), and Broadway Melody of 1940 (1940). She retired from films in the mid-1940s and then began hosting a Christian children's TV show, but she resurfaced for the occasional specialty dance scene in films such as Thousands Cheer and eventually headlined a successful nightclub act in Las Vegas. She died from cancer at 69. Powell is known as one of the most versatile and powerful female dancers of the Hollywood studio era.

Early life
Powell was born in Springfield, Massachusetts, to Clarence Gardner Powell and Blanche Torrey Powell. Her father left her and her mother when she was two years old. She was raised by her mother with the help of her maternal grandparents (who also lived with them). Eleanor Powell was a painfully shy child, not even able to greet guests that would come into their own house.

Introduction to dance 
Powell's mother, Blanche, sent Eleanor to dance lessons at age 11, in hopes that it would combat her shyness. She trained locally with Ralph McKernan (also the teacher of dancer/choreographer Robert Alton) in classical ballet and "interpretive" modern dance. Powell also trained extensively in acrobatics. She immediately showed a natural aptitude for movement, and was discovered by Gus Edwards (of the "Vaudeville Kiddie Review") whilst performing acrobatics on a beach in Atlantic City, NJ. She subsequently began working her first paid gigs for Edwards at the age of 12, during her summer holidays. Powell's first gig was in Atlantic City at the Ritz Grill, located in the Ambassador Hotel. She performed an acrobatic "specialty" act, and was by no means a star in the show, however she received consistently favorable reviews and this led to other paid performance opportunities, and eventually, more featured spots. Jack Benny and Eddie Cantor, who frequented Atlantic City and saw her perform (and her teacher, McKernan) are credited with having suggested to Powell that she set her sights on Broadway.

New York City: introduction to tap 
In 1927, Powell took a break from her schooling and moved with her mother to New York City. She was signed by William Grady at the William Morris Agency, and although she managed to book jobs almost immediately dancing in clubs, vaudeville and at private parties, her acrobatic specialty which had impressed in Atlantic City was not enough for a career on Broadway. Realizing that in order to be marketable as a dancer on Broadway at that time one had to be able to tap dance, Powell began a package of ten tap lessons at a school run by Jack Donahue and Johnny Boyle – these lessons would be the only formal tap training she would ever have. Powell disliked tap at first and had to be coaxed in order to return after her first lesson. She is quoted as saying "in about the seventh lesson it all came together. Just like an algebra problem –  you have a tutor teaching you and all of a sudden you say, 'oh, now I see!'".

In training Powell, Donohue and Boyle used an unconventional method: in order to counteract her tendency toward pulling away from the floor and working through her feet, as one does in classical ballet and acrobatics, they had her wear an army surplus belt during her lessons, which had one sandbag attached on either side. This was intended to weigh her down, help her to feel the floor in a different way, and engage with it – to "play" the floor as if it were an instrument. This not only served to help Powell "find her legs" in tap dance, it also was to be a catalyst in the development of her uniquely grounded and smooth tap style.

Powell, now 16 years of age, booked tour on the vaudeville circuit, where she shared a bill with, among others, the renowned tap dance duo Buck & Bubbles. She was strongly influenced by John "Bubbles" Sublett in particular, who was a highly inventive and creative tap dancer. Hailed as the "Father of Rhythm Tap," he is known for bringing tap dance down into the heels, and incorporating unexpected rhythms that broke out of the more predictable meter of the time. Bill "Bojangles" Robinson had popularized an extremely Irish-influenced tap style, barely leaving the balls of his feet – it was bouncy and buoyant. Sublett "got down into the floor" and his style and inventiveness were a huge inspiration to Eleanor, who had recently "found the floor" herself. Powell named John "Bubbles" Sublett as one of her main influences, and it shows in her grounded, syncopated footwork (what is now thought of as "hoofing," even though in that era, hoofing really referred to any vaudeville tap act, tap improviser, or tapping chorus member – and a hoofer did not use their arms, instead dancing from the waist-down and letting their upper body stay free and loose).

Dance style 
Eleanor Powell developed a dance style that fused her ballet and acrobatic abilities with her grounded taps. She moved smoothly and effortlessly through fast, complex footwork, barely leaving the floor, even to perform tap steps that take place while airborne, such as double pullbacks (sometimes tapping in a "hoofing" style, with natural, loose arms, and other times with a more technical, placed port de bras). This was contrasted with energetic turn sequences, high-flying, buoyant leaps, such as grand jeté en tourants, and grande battements, which further showed her technique and flexibility. She incorporated Hula for the film Honolulu, which then infiltrated her choreography for years to come.

Broadway 
When she was 17, she brought her graceful, athletic style to Broadway, where she starred in various revues and musicals, including Follow Thru (1929), which represented her first Broadway success, Fine and Dandy (1930), and At Home Abroad (1935). During this time, she was dubbed "the world's greatest female tap dancer"  due to her machine-gun footwork. In the early 1930s, she appeared as a chorus girl in a couple of early minor musical films.

Road to Hollywood

In 1935, Powell made the move to Hollywood and performed a specialty number in her first major film, George White's 1935 Scandals, which she later described as a disaster because she was accidentally made up to look like an Egyptian. The experience left her unimpressed with Hollywood and when she was courted by Metro-Goldwyn-Mayer, she initially refused their offers of a contract. Powell reportedly attempted to dissuade the studio by making what she felt would be unreasonable salary demands, but MGM agreed to them and she finally accepted. The studio groomed her for stardom, making minimal changes in her makeup and conduct.

Film stardom

Powell was well received in her first starring role in 1935 Broadway Melody of 1936 (in which she was supported by Jack Benny and Frances Langford), and delighted 1930s audiences with her endless energy and enthusiasm, not to mention her stunning dancing. According to dancer Ann Miller, quoted in the "making-of" documentary That's Entertainment! III, MGM was headed for bankruptcy in the late 1930s, but the films of Eleanor Powell, particularly Broadway Melody of 1936, were so popular that they made the company profitable again. Miller also credits Powell for inspiring her own dancing career, which would lead her to become an MGM musical star a decade later.

Powell would go on to star opposite many of the decade's top leading men, including James Stewart, Robert Taylor, Fred Astaire, George Murphy, Nelson Eddy, and Robert Young. Among the films she made during the height of her career in the mid-to-late 1930s were Born to Dance (1936), Rosalie (1937), Broadway Melody of 1938 (1937), Honolulu (1939), and Broadway Melody of 1940 (1940). All of these movies featured her amazing solo tapping, although her increasingly huge production numbers began to draw criticism. Her characters also sang, but Powell's singing voice was usually (but not always) dubbed. (This would also happen to one of Powell's successors, Cyd Charisse.) Broadway Melody of 1940, in which Powell starred opposite Fred Astaire, featured an acclaimed musical score by Cole Porter.

Together, Astaire and Powell danced to Porter's "Begin the Beguine", which is considered by many to be one of the greatest tap sequences in film history. According to accounts of the making of this film, including a documentary included on the DVD release, Astaire was somewhat intimidated by Powell, who was considered the only female dancer ever capable of out-dancing Astaire. In his autobiography Steps in Time, Astaire remarked, "She 'put 'em down like a man', no ricky-ticky-sissy stuff with Ellie. She really knocked out a tap dance in a class by herself." In his introduction to the clip, featured in That's Entertainment, Frank Sinatra said, "You know, you can wait around and hope, but I tell ya, you'll never see the likes of this again."

Decline in popularity

Following Broadway Melody of 1940 Powell was sidelined for many months following a gall stone operation and things changed somewhat for the worse, at least as far as Powell's movie career was concerned. Lady Be Good (1941) gave Powell top billing and a classic dance routine to "Fascinatin' Rhythm," but the main stars were Ann Sothern and Robert Young. Ship Ahoy (1942) and I Dood It (1943), in which Powell starred with Red Skelton, are considered lesser efforts, although in Ship Ahoy her character nonetheless played a central role in the story, and Powell's dance skills were put to practical use when she managed to tap out a Morse code message to a secret agent in the middle of a dance routine. In another routine from Ship Ahoy, she danced to the Tommy Dorsey Orchestra with Buddy Rich on drums and the two performed a great musical partnership with the number "Tallulah". She was signed to play opposite Dan Dailey in For Me and My Gal in 1942, but the two actors were removed from the picture during rehearsals and replaced by Gene Kelly and Judy Garland. Later, production of a new Broadway Melody film that would have paired Powell with Kelly was also cancelled.

Powell parted with MGM in 1943 after her next film, Thousands Cheer, in which she appeared only for a few minutes to perform a specialty number (as part of an all-star cast), and the same year married actor Glenn Ford. She danced in a giant pinball machine in Sensations of 1945 (1944) for United Artists, but the film  was a critical and commercial disappointment. Her performance was overshadowed by what was to be the final film appearance of W. C. Fields. She then retired to concentrate on raising her son, Peter Ford, who was born that year. She appeared in a couple of documentary-style short subjects about celebrities in the late 1940s. Overseas audiences did get to see one additional Powell dance performance in 1946, however: the compilation The Great Morgan included a number that had been cut from Honolulu.

In 1950, Powell returned to MGM one last time in Duchess of Idaho, starring Esther Williams. Appearing as herself in a nightclub scene, a hesitant Powell is invited to dance by bandleader Dick Layne (Van Johnson). She begins with a staid, almost balletic performance until she is chided by Layne for being lazy. She then strips off her skirt, revealing her famous legs, and  performs a "boogie-woogie"-style specialty number very similar to the one she performed in Thousands Cheer seven years earlier. Williams, in her autobiography The Million Dollar Mermaid, writes of being touched, watching Powell rehearsing until her feet bled, in order to make her brief appearance as perfect as possible.

Later career: TV and stage

After Duchess of Idaho, Powell returned to private life. In May 1952, she emerged as a guest star on an episode of All Star Revue with Danny Thomas and June Havoc. Around this time, she was ordained a minister of the Unity Church and later hosted an Emmy Award-winning Sunday morning TV program for youth entitled The Faith of Our Children (1953–1955). Her son, Peter Ford, was a regular on this show and would later find his own success as a rock and roll singer and as an actor. In 1955, Powell made her last film appearance when she appeared in Have Faith in Our Children, a three-minute short film produced for the Variety Club of Northern California in which Powell asked viewers to donate to the charity. The short, which other than its title had no relation to the TV series, marked the only time Powell appeared on screen with Glenn Ford.

Powell divorced Ford in 1959, and that year, encouraged by Peter, launched a highly publicized nightclub career, including appearances at Lou Walters' Latin Quarter in Boston. The athleticism which characterised her dance style remained with her well into middle age. Her live performances continued well into the 1960s. During the early 1960s she made several guest appearances on variety TV programs, including The Ed Sullivan Show and The Hollywood Palace. She made her final public appearance in 1981 at a televised American Film Institute tribute to Fred Astaire, where she received a standing ovation.

Death
Eleanor Powell died February 11, 1982, of ovarian cancer, aged 69, and is interred in the Hollywood Forever Cemetery in Hollywood in the Cathedral Mausoleum, Foyer Niche 432, Tier 3.

Reintroduction
Powell was reintroduced to audiences in the popular That's Entertainment! documentary in 1974, and its sequels That's Entertainment Part II (1976) and That's Entertainment! III (1994) and the related film That's Dancing! (1985) which spotlight her dancing from films such as Broadway Melody of 1940, Lady Be Good, and Born to Dance. She is one of only a few performers to be the subject of spotlight segments (as opposed to being included in a montage with other performers) in all four films. That's Entertainment! III is notable for including behind-the-scenes footage of her "Fascinatin' Rhythm" routine from Lady Be Good.

Powell's films continue to be broadcast on television regularly by Turner Classic Movies, with most released in the VHS video format in 1980s and 1990s. North American DVD release of her work has been slower in coming. Aside from clips from her films being included in the aforementioned That's Entertainment! trilogy, plus clips that were featured in other releases such as the 2002 special edition DVD release of Singin' in the Rain, it wasn't until the 2003 DVD release of Broadway Melody of 1940 that a complete Powell film was released in the format. In February 2007, Warner Home Video announced plans to release a boxed DVD set of Eleanor Powell's musical films by year end. This did not occur; instead, on April 8, 2008 Warner released a third boxed set in the Classic Musicals from the Dream Factory series, with nine films, four of which star Powell: Broadway Melody of 1936, Born to Dance, Broadway Melody of 1938, and Lady Be Good. The films are expected to be released in individual two film sets (the two Broadway Melody films in one set, Born to Dance/Lady Be Good on the other) later in the year. Since 2007 several other Powell films have emerged on DVD, including Rosalie, I Dood It (1943) and Sensations of 1945 (1945).

Trivia 

 Eleanor Powell was inspired by certain forms of the Hula, a Polynesian dance, and learned some hula technique in order to incorporate it into her dance numbers in the film "Honolulu" (1939). This influence remained as part of her repertoire and hints of it can be seen in some subsequent (non Hawaiian-style) numbers of hers, for example, during the introductory (legato) section of her boogie woogie tap feature in "Duchess of Idaho" (1950).
 Eleanor Powell was friends with Bill "Bojangles" Robinson early on in her career, when they both worked in New York and danced at private parties. Powell would accompany Robinson through back entrances and in freight elevators, as due to segregation, he was not allowed to enter through the front. Invariably, the host would offer her a glass of water, and she would answer "Yes, and I'm sure Mr. Robinson would like one, too." (And, always, after finishing his glass of water, Robinson would deliberately break his glass, and then pay for the damage, knowing it was unlikely that, after a black man had drunk from it, the glass would be used again.)
 Eleanor Powell was a contributor to Dance Magazine in the United States, even contributing a monthly column for the magazine in 1937.
 During 1935, Powell was a regular on radio, where she sang and danced (radio shows had live audiences then), and had her own show that aired weekly on CBS Radio. It was called "The Flying Red Horse Tavern."
 Powell choreographed her own numbers. She collaborated with the likes of Fred Astaire for duets with him, but for her solos, she was the creative voice for her own movement and rhythm.
 She was heavily involved in the editing process of her musical numbers, and took the time to learn about the technical side, particularly post-production. She would insist on cutting her films with the in-house editor, as she believed that one must understand dance to understand how it should be shown to an audience most effectively.
 She was one of the only leading ladies in the Golden Age of Hollywood who, even when partnered with a man, was not submissive to him – she held her own, and even when in ballroom-style holds, often led (as in the "Italian Cafe Routine," also known as the "Jukebox Dance" in Broadway Melody of 1940). But most often, she was side by side, as an equal.

Filmography

Features
Queen High (1930)
George White's 1935 Scandals (1935)
Broadway Melody of 1936 (1935) as Eleanor Powell
Born to Dance (1936)
Broadway Melody of 1938 (1937)
Rosalie (1937)
Honolulu (1939)
Broadway Melody of 1940 (1940)
Lady Be Good (1941)
Ship Ahoy (1942)
Thousands Cheer (1943)
I Dood It (1943)
Sensations of 1945 (1944)
Duchess of Idaho (1950)

Short films
Screen Snapshots Series 15, No. 12 (1936)
Screen Snapshots: Famous Hollywood Mothers (1947)
Screen Snapshots: Hollywood Holiday (1948)
Have Faith in Our Children (1955)

See also 
 List of dancers

Notes

References
 Margie Schultz: Eleanor Powell: A Bio-Bibliography, Greenwood Press, 1994,

External links
 
 
 
 Photographs and literature
 

1912 births
1982 deaths
20th-century American actresses
20th-century American dancers
Actors from Springfield, Massachusetts
Actresses from Massachusetts
American female dancers
American film actresses
American musical theatre actresses
American people of Welsh descent
American tap dancers
Burials at Hollywood Forever Cemetery
Deaths from cancer in California
Deaths from ovarian cancer
Metro-Goldwyn-Mayer contract players
Musicians from Springfield, Massachusetts
Unity Church
Vaudeville performers